The Nordic Journal of English Studies (NJES) is a Nordic peer-reviewed academic journal focusing on English language and literature. It was established in 2002 and published by the University of Oslo until 2006 and then by the University of Gothenburg until 2020. NJES is associated with the Nordic Association of English Studies. The current editors are Virginia Langum (literature) and Terry Walker  (linguistics). The former editors were Karin Aijmer (linguistics) and Chloé Avril (literature). 

Two or three issues of the journal are published each year. The publications are both general issues and special theme issues with guest editors. We warmly invite prospective inquiries about special issues. NJES is particularly interested in topics that place different areas of English studies (e.g., linguistics, literature, teaching and learning) in dialogue. While scholars based in institutions outside the Nordic countries are welcome to submit proposals for special issues, the journal expects at least one contribution to be from a scholar at a Nordic institution. 

The general issues serve as a venue for original research in the fields of English studies, including language, literature, culture, and the teaching and learning of English. For the general issues, NJES invites submissions from scholars with an affiliation to a Nordic institution. 

NJES also publishes conference proceedings and festschrifts to honour a Nordic colleague if they can be subsumed under a special theme. The journal also publishes reviews of books thought to be of interest to its readers.

The policy of the journal is also to provide a possibility for early career or doctoral researchers to publish their articles on English language or literature in a peer-reviewed journal along with more established scholars.

A number of thematic issues have been published, including:
 English for Academic Purposes
 Textual Masculinity
 Literature as Communication
 English as a lingua franca

External links 
 
 Nordic Association of English Studies Homepage

Literary magazines published in Sweden
Linguistics journals
Open access journals
Publications established in 2002
English-language journals
University of Gothenburg
2002 establishments in Sweden